Liao Yiaoxiang (16 May 1906 – 2 December 1968), was a high-ranking Kuomintang commander who successful fought against both the Imperial Japanese Army and Chinese Communist forces. Apart from General Sun Liren, he was one of the few Nationalist commanders who graduated from a military academy in the West. After the end of the Second Sino-Japanese War, he served as a field commander in Manchuria until his capture by Marshal Lin Biao's Manchurian Field Army in the Liaoshen Campaign.  General Liao was held for 12 years as a prisoner of war until 1961 and died seven years later during the Cultural Revolution.

Early life and career
Liao Yiaoxiang was born into a rural gentry family in Hunan Province in 1906. He entered a local high school with Yang Kaihui, wife of Chinese Communist leader Mao Zedong. In 1926, he applied to enter the Whampoa Military Academy and graduated with top remarks. Some of his famous classmates included Chen Cheng, Xue Yue, Fan Hanjie, Dai Li, Hu Zongnan, Qiu Qingquan, Du Yuming, Zhang Lingfu, Hu Lien, Liu Yuzhang, Huang Wei, Li Mi, Wang Yaowu and Lin Biao. In 1930 he was chosen by Generalissimo Chiang Kai-shek as an exchange student to France. In 1936 he graduated from the famed École spéciale militaire de Saint-Cyr with best grades in the class. He returned home in the same year and was promoted as company commander of the Cavalry unit of the Whampoa Military Academy with the rank of major.

Second Sino-Japanese War
In 1937, the Second Sino-Japanese War broke out, Liao was promoted as chief of staff of the 2nd reserve brigade with the rank of lieutenant colonel. He saw action in the Battle of Shanghai and Battle of Nanjing. During the bloody street fighting in Nanjing, Liao became stranded in the city along with his classmates Sun Yuanliang, Wang Yaowu and Qiu Qingquan; he escaped the Nanjing Massacre disguised as a Buddhist monk. After the Battle of Wuhan, he was promoted to colonel and commander of officer training corps. He wrote a letter to President Chiang Kai-shek, suggesting making drastic changes in the National Revolutionary Army and build a modern armored unit. Chiang was very pleased with this advice and had a very favorable impression on Liao. In 1938, Chiang promoted Liao as a major general and chief of staff of the 200th Division (National Revolutionary Army). Liao's division commander was Du Yuming. In September 1938, the 200th division was expanded as the 5th corps; the only motorized unit in the Chinese nationalist army. Liao was again placed in charge of command of reserve officer corps and served as assistant division commander of the new 22nd division. Because his superior officer General Qiu Qingquan was away on a mission, he also served as acting division commander. In September 1939, the new 22nd division was sent to Guangxi to fight against Japanese 5th Division (Imperial Japanese Army) and scored an important field victory, Japanese commander Major General Masao Nakamura was killed in action along with 8,000 men in the Battle of Kunlun Pass. Afterward his unit was transferred to Yunnan and guarding supplies that came from the Burma Road. After the Japanese navy bombed Pearl Harbor, Japanese conquest of Burma began in January 1942, the Fifteenth Army (Japan) under General Shōjirō Iida invaded British Crown colony of Burma. The British government sent a demand for help to Chongqing, Generalissimo Chiang Kai-shek organized the Chinese Expeditionary Force (in Burma) under Chief of Staff General Joseph Stilwell, Lieutenant General Du Yuming, deputy commander of the Chinese Expeditionary Force (in Burma) and General Sun Liren, commander of the new 38th division to rescue the British forces and prevent Japanese capture of Burma and their aim to severing the Burma Road. Although the Chinese commanders were able to score some victories in Battle of Yenangyaung and Battle of Toungoo, because the British forces failed to stop the Japanese advance on the battlefield, the Chinese forces were forced to retreat from Burma. When the 18th Division (Imperial Japanese Army) cut off their retreat route, the New 22nd Division was forced to go through the Kachin Hills and many veterans died of disease, starvation, as well as animal attacks, before finally made it back to Ledo, Assam. While in India, the New 22nd Division and New 38th Division formed the Chinese Army in India, General Joseph Stilwell made sure these Chinese units received latest American weaponry and training. In 1943, the Chinese forces attacked the Burma Area Army under General Heitarō Kimura. General Liao won some major victories and his unit was expanded into the New 6th Army in 1944. In April 1945 General Liao's New 6th Army flew home for the first time in 3 years and decisively defeated the Japanese forces in the Battle of West Hunan, the deputy leader of the National War Council General He Yingqin decorated him with the Order of Blue Sky and White Sun, the highest honor a Chinese commander can achieve.

Chinese Civil War

When the Chinese Civil War broke out in Manchuria, President Chiang Kai-shek was determined to recover Manchuria for the Nationalist Government. General Liao's New 6th Army and General Sun Liren's New 1st Army spearheaded nationalist advance into the Region. In order to dislodge communist-held cities in Manchuria, Chiang Kai-shek named General Du Yuming as commander-in-chief of Manchuria, Defense Minister General Bai Chongxi as Chief of Staff of the Manchurian Security Command. Chinese Communist leader Mao Zedong picked Marshal Lin Biao in the Campaign to Defend Siping. General Liao Yaoxiang succeeded in capture communist strongholds outside of Siping and forced Communist commanders to abandon the city. The nationalist commanders started to capture most of the cities and towns south of the Songhua River, But President Chiang Kai-shek issued an order to forbid them to cross the river because the Marshall Mission was taken place in China proper. When President Chiang Kai-shek replaced Du Yuming with General Chen Cheng, the situation grew from bad to worse, because the success of the land reform movement in the region and the defection of the Manchukuo Imperial Army to PLA, Communist strength grew over to 1 million men. In 1947, President Chiang Kai-shek appointed General Liao as commander-in-chief of the 9th Army Group, his unit included: The New 1st Army, New 3rd Army, New 6th Army, the 49th Army, 52nd Army, 71st Army, the independent enhanced 207th division and three cavalry brigades. In September 1948, the Communist Manchurian Field Army under Marshal Lin Biao launched the Liaoshen Campaign. General Liao suggested to Nationalist High Command the 9th Army Group must retreat to Yingkou, a nationalist-held seaport and leave Manchuria via sea. But instead, President Chiang Kai-shek ordered him to rescue General Fan Hanjie's besieged forces in Jinzhou. But before General Liao could relieve Jinzhou the city has fallen and Changchun, another nationalist stronghold in Manchuria has changed hands as well. Finally General Du Yuming persuaded Chiang Kai-shek to allow the 9th Army Group to retreat to North China, but they were unable to break through the PLA defensive line around Heishan (黑山) and Dahushan (大虎山), and lost a considerable amount of time. During a surprise night raid, one communist unit destroyed General Liao's Army Group Headquarters, as a result, his entire command structure was disrupted. Between October 20 to October 28, the PLA forces under General Han Xianchu attacked at Liaoxi (遼西戰役) in the area east of Heshan and Dahushan, and west of Raoyanghe (饒陽河). They destroyed twelve Nationalist divisions, including the elite New 1st Army, New 6th Army of 110,000 men, and captured Liao Yaoxiang. Only General Liu Yuzhang's 52nd Army was able to retreat to Shanghai.

Release and death
After his capture, General Liao was held as a prisoner in Beijing's war criminal camp with his former commander Du Yuming until his pardon in 1961. He was appointed as a commissioner in the Chinese People's Political Consultative Conference in charge of his historical data. He was still very bittered about those high-ranking communist moles in the KMT department of defense, such as director of war-planning board  and Vice Chief of Staff Liu Fei, who leaked vital military plans to the communist commanders that result in his defeat. In 1968, General Liao was forced into a struggle session by the Red Guards at the height of the Cultural Revolution, he died of a heart attack at the scene at age 62.

See also
Sun Liren
New 1st Army
New 6th Army
Du Yuming
Liaoshen Campaign

References
Ministry of National Defense R.O.C 
US Naval War College

《雪白血红》 張正隆 解放軍出版社 1989年8月 /
《辽沈战役概述》杜聿明, 文史资料选辑 第二十辑，1961年8月
《东北战场与辽沈战役》韩先楚，《辽沈决战》人民出版社
《第十二纵队在辽沈战役中》 袁升平，《辽沈决战》人民出版社
《辽沈决战》（上、下）人民出版社 /

École Spéciale Militaire de Saint-Cyr alumni
Chinese military personnel of World War II
National Revolutionary Army generals from Hunan
Chinese anti-communists
Whampoa Military Academy alumni
Chinese prisoners of war
1906 births
1968 deaths
Recipients of the Order of Blue Sky and White Sun
People from Shaoyang
Burials at Babaoshan Revolutionary Cemetery